Lieutenant-General Sir James Moncrieff Grierson,  ADC (Gen.) (27 January 1859 – 17 August 1914) was a British soldier.

Life 

He was born in 1859 the son of George Moncrieff Grierson and his wife Allison Lyon Walker.

Grierson was commissioned into the Royal Artillery in 1877.

He served in the Egyptian War including the actions at Kassassin and Tel el Kebir, as Deputy Assistant Quartermaster General with the Indian contingent in 1882. He was Deputy Assistant Adjutant and Quartermaster General for the Sudan expedition and was involved in actions at Suakin, Hasheen and Tamai in 1885. He was Deputy Assistant Quartermaster General for 2nd Brigade during the Hazara expedition in 1888. He was appointed Deputy Assistant Adjutant General, Intelligence, at Army Headquarters in 1890 and then became Brigade Major for the Royal Artillery at Aldershot from 1895 to 1896 when he became Military Attaché in Berlin acquiring what Sir John French later described as "an intimate knowledge of the German army."

He served in China during the Boxer Rebellion in 1900, and later the same year in the Second Boer War in South Africa. Lt-Col Grierson was in charge of army baggage during Roberts’ march on Bloemfontein.

After returning from the war he became Assistant Quartermaster General for the 2nd Army Corps and Chief Staff Officer to Sir Evelyn Wood, commanding the corps; and was promoted to the substantive rank of colonel on 28 October 1901. In early 1902 he was ordered for temporary duty in the Remount Department. Later that year he returned to his position in the 2nd Army corps, where he was appointed a Brigadier-General on the Staff and Chief Staff Officer of the corps from 4 September 1902.

Grierson was appointed Director of Military Operations at Army Headquarters in 1904. As DMO, Grierson and his deputy Robertson organised the Strategic War Game of 1905, which persuaded them that British intervention (still expected to be deployed to Antwerp at this stage) was necessary to avoid French defeat in the event of a Franco-German war. Grierson acted as umpire for the wargame. In January 1906, as the First Moroccan Crisis continued, Grierson was tasked with drawing up detailed plans for deployment of an expeditionary force to Le Havre in the event of war. Grierson and Robertson began talks with the French General Staff and with the French military attaché Colonel Victor Huguet, and that same year Grierson, Robertson and Huguet toured the Charleroi to Namur area. However, little further progress was made until after Wilson became DMO in 1910.

Grierson was then appointed General Officer Commanding, 1st Division at Aldershot Command in 1906 and General Officer Commanding-in-Chief for Eastern Command in 1912.

In the Army Manoeuvres of 1912, he made full use of aircraft reconnaissance to decisively beat Douglas Haig, despite Haig having the odds in his favour.

In the Army Manoeuvres of 1913, Grierson acted as Chief of the General Staff (CGS) for Sir John French. Douglas Haig noted in his diary, "Sir John French's instructions for moving along the front of his enemy (then halted on a fortified position) and subsequently attacking the latter's distant flank, were of such an unpractical nature that his Chief of the General Staff demurred. Some slight modifications in the orders were permitted, but Grierson ceased to be his CGS on mobilization, and was very soon transferred to another appointment in the BEF." Even before leaving the field of the manoeuvres (26 September 1913), French told Wilson that he was not satisfied with Grierson's performance. Murray was appointed chief of staff designate in his place. French himself described Grierson as a "dear old friend and comrade", ..who astonished French soldiers by his knowledge of the history of their regiments and whose "military acquirements were brilliant and in every respect up to date."

Grierson was very overweight, and used to go red in the face from bending over, due to high blood pressure, and Edmonds later claimed that his staff were issued with penknives to bleed him if necessary. He died of an aneurism of the heart on a train, near Amiens at 7:00 a.m. on 17 August 1914. His replacement as commander of II Corps was Sir Horace Smith-Dorrien. Grierson spoke French fluently and was a personal friend of Haig, the commander of I Corps, so it is possible that relations over the next few days, both between the two British corps and with the French, might have been better had he lived.

Grierson's body was repatriated, a practice allowed at that time, and is buried in the Glasgow Necropolis in PRIMUS 38 with his sister, father and mother. These were full interments. The grave lies north of the path connecting the south-east corner of the upper plateau with the low-lying southern section.

Recognition

The Sir James Moncrieff Grierson Prize for languages was later established at the Royal Military Academy Sandhurst.

Medals and Orders 

British decorations
 Companion of the Order of St Michael and St George (CMG) - 26 June 1902 - Coronation Honours list
 Royal Victorian Order, Commander (CVO) - 1904 (Member MVO 1890s)
 Knight Commander of the Order of the Bath (KCB), 1911 (Companion (CB) 29 November 1900, in recognition of the services during operations in China)
 Knight of Grace of The Most Venerable Order of the Hospital of St. John of Jerusalem
 Egypt Medal, 1882, clasps for "Tel el Kebir" and "Suakin 1885"
 India General Service Medal (1854), clasp for "Hazara 1888"
 Queen Victoria Diamond Jubilee Medal
 Queen's South Africa Medal, clasps for "Cape Colony", "Driefontein", "Johannesburg", and "Diamond Hill"
 China War Medal (1900)
 King Edward VII Coronation Medal
 King George V Coronation Medal
 Aide de Camp General to the King

Foreign decorations
  5th Class, Order of the Medjidie, Ottoman Empire
  Khedive's Star, Khedivate of Egypt - 1882
  1st Class, Order of the Crown, Kingdom of Prussia - 1901 - on the termination of his appointment as Military Attaché at Berlin (he had previously received the 2nd class of the same order in late 1899, in connection with a visit of Emperor Wilhelm II to the United Kingdom.)
  Albert Order Medal, Kingdom of Saxony - 1911
  Knight Grand Cross of the Order of the Crown of Siam, Kingdom of Thailand - 1911
  King Rama VI's Coronation Medal, Kingdom of Thailand - 1911

Publications by Grierson 
 Notes on the Turkish Army  Simla 1882 (compiled for the Intelligence Branch, India)
 A Vocabulary of the Arabic Language  Roorkee 1882
 The War in Turkomania: Skobeleff's Campaign of 1880-81  Translated from the Russian of Major-General N. I. Grodekov. Simla 1884-85
 The Armed Strength of Russia  Two editions: London 1886 and 1892 (compiled for the Intelligence Branch, London)
 The Armed Strength of Japan  London 1886 (compiled for the Intelligence Branch, London)
 The Armed Strength of the German Empire  Two editions: London 1888 and 1892 (compiled for the Intelligence Branch, London)
 Staff Duties in the Field: With Notes by Lieut.-General H. Brackenbury  London 1891
 Handbook of the Military Forces of Russia  London 1894 (compiled for the Intelligence Branch, London)
 Umpiring at Field Manoeuvres as practised by various foreign armies  (Aldershot Military Society Lectures, No. 51) Aldershot 1894
 Die Heere und Flotten der Gegenwart: II: Grossbritannien und Irland  The British Army. Berlin 1897
 Records of the Scottish Volunteer Force, 1859–1908  Edinburgh and London 1909
 Military Papers and Articles, Translations, Reviews contributed to military journals both British and foreign, and to the daily press.

Further reading 
The Life of Sir James Moncrieff Grierson by D.S. Macdiarmid (London: Constable, 1923)

 Harper

References

External links 

Centre for First World War Studies
Liddell Hart Centre for Military Archives
The Army Navy Air Force site has a copyrighted photograph (you will need to scroll down to see it.)
University of Glasgow Manuscripts Catalogue
Glasgow Cathedral Picture Tour

|-

}
|-
 

|-
 

|-

1859 births
1914 deaths
British Army lieutenant generals
Royal Artillery officers
British Army personnel of the Anglo-Egyptian War
British Army personnel of the Boxer Rebellion
British Army personnel of the Second Boer War
British Army generals of World War I
Knights of Grace of the Order of St John
Commanders of the Royal Victorian Order
Knights Commander of the Order of the Bath
Companions of the Order of St Michael and St George
Commandeurs of the Légion d'honneur
Recipients of the Order of the Medjidie, 5th class
Recipients of the Order of St. Anna, 2nd class
Burials at the Glasgow Necropolis
British military attachés
Deaths from aneurysm
Military personnel from Glasgow